Duhwa, or Karfa (also Kerifa, Nzuhwi) is an Afro-Asiatic language spoken in Nasarawa State, Nigeria.

Notes

West Chadic languages
Languages of Nigeria